Sette note in nero is a 1977 Italian giallo film directed by Lucio Fulci and co-written by him with Roberto Gianviti and Dardano Sacchetti. Sette note in nero stars Jennifer O'Neill, Gianni Garko, Marc Porel, and Ida Galli. The film involves a woman who begins experiencing psychic visions that lead her to discover a murder; her husband is charged with the killing. The psychic must embark on an investigation with a paranormal researcher to clear her husband's name of the crime.
 
The film was released in the United States as The Psychic, and also as Seven Notes in Black. Other alternate titles include Murder to the Tune of the Seven Black Notes and Death Tolls Seven Times.

Plot 
In 1959 Dover, England, a woman commits suicide by leaping from a cliff. At the same time, her daughter, Virginia, living in Florence, Italy, sees her mother's death in a vision. By 1977, an adult Virginia (Jennifer O'Neill) is living near Rome and is married to a rich Italian businessman Francesco Ducci (Gianni Garko). Ducci leaves on a business trip, and as Virginia drives herself away from the airport after seeing him off, experiences more visions—she sees an old woman murdered, a wall being torn down and a letter hidden beneath a statue.

Virginia plans to renovate an abandoned mansion her husband has bought, but notices that the building resembles the one she has seen in her visions. She tears down a wall in one room, finding a skeleton behind the plaster. Assuming the skeleton is that of the woman in her vision, Virginia contacts the police. However, they do not believe her story and charge Ducci with the killing.

Examination of the body reveals it not to be an old woman, but one in her twenties; killed about five years earlier. The skeleton is finally identified as Ducci's ex-girlfriend, Agneta Bignardi, who vanished several years ago. Virginia is determined to exculpate her husband, and contacts her friend Luca Fattori (Marc Porel). Fattori is a researcher of psychic phenomena, and his investigation eventually leads to the wealthy Emilio Rospini (Gabriele Ferzetti), who may be the true culprit.

Francesco returns from his business trip where Virginia updates him on everything that has happened. He urges her to dismiss the matter from her mind, but she instead grows more and more obsessed with learning this mystery.

Virginia discusses the case with Francesco's sister Gloria (Evelyn Stewart), and Melli (Riccardo Parisio Perrotti), a lawyer friend of Gloria's. Gloria says that her brother left for a business trip to America in April 1972, and that she was the one who changed the furniture of the place. The room with the walled-in corpse had been Franceso's bedroom, but it was Gloria who had bought the furniture that Virginia saw in her vision, after Francesco's departure.

A few days later, Virginia buys a magazine which runs a picture of the murdered woman on the front cover, exactly the same magazine from Virginia's vision. When Luca notices that the magazine has only existed for a year, it becomes apparent to him that Virginia has experienced a premonition, not a vision of past crimes. Virginia and Luca find more evidence that appears to clear Francesco, allowing him to get released on bail. Gloria, in the meantime, gives Virginia a wristwatch as a gift, one that plays a haunting tune on the hour.

Details from the premonitions start to occur in front of Virginia with greater and greater frequency. Virginia takes a yellow taxi, with a blinking CB radio light, from Luca's office to her home (just as seen in her vision). The mysterious old woman phones Virginia, leaving a message on her answering machine, offering information about the case. When Virginia arrives at her house, she finds her dead (in the same position from Virginia's vision). Rospini appears and Virginia flees in panic. Grabbing a vital letter featured on a coffee table in her vision, Virginia escapes down the road to a neighboring church that is undergoing repairs. Virginia's hiding place is given away when her wristwatch chimes go off. Rospini tries to reach her on a wooden scaffold, but slips and falls to the marble floor, many feet below.

Virginia runs back to her husband's old villa nearby, and phones him at his office to come see her right away. When he arrives, Virginia is alarmed by his limp (just as in her vision), which he claims to have twisted his ankle just a few hours before. They go inside to the fateful room. Francesco puts down a copy of the magazine with Agneta on the cover, right on the table as described in the vision. Growing more nervous, Virginia starts smoking one of Gloria's yellow cigarettes, and places it in an ashtray also featured in the vision.

At the hospital, the police talk to the badly injured Rospini, who can barely gasp out his explanation of the events. Back in 1972, the old woman, Signora Casati, had an illicit buyer for a valuable painting in a nearby gallery. Francesco, Rospini, and Agneta Bignardi had all been involved in stealing it. Rospini killed a guard, a fact mentioned in a letter Agneta wrote to Casati. Rospini was not trying to kill Virginia, but only trying to retrieve the letter. Casati was already dead when he arrived, having been killed by Francesco, who sustained a twisted ankle after jumping out of a window. It was Francesco who murdered Agneta five years ago after she enraged him by trying to make off with the painting alone.

Alone with her husband, Virginia becomes more and more frightened by the gradual confluences of elements from her vision. The last crucial link in the chain occurs when Francesco sees the incriminating letter on the dresser. Virginia claims that she hasn't read it, but he refuses to believe her. He suddenly attacks his wife with a fireplace poker. His first blow misses as she ducks and it smashes a mirror (seen in the vision). The next blow strikes her on the head. As Virginia lies on the floor, bleeding profusely, he prepares to wall her into the excavated hole in the wall. Finally, all the details of room fit with the vision: Virginia realizes that she was victim all along.

A little later, Luca figures out from the magazine cover about the real location and time which Francesco could have murdered Agneta Bignardi. He then races over to the Ducci villa, while being chased by two motorcycle cops who are trying to arrest him for speeding. He manages to keep their fingers off his collar long enough to elaborate his suspicions. Francesco invites them all into his house and into the room, expressing concern at his wife's disappearance. Despite the policemen's questions and Luca's remarks, they cannot break Francesco's bland self-control. As Luca turns to leave, escorted by the police, everyone hears the haunting tune, like a music box chime, emerging from the wall where Virginia is hidden.

Cast 
Jennifer O'Neill as Virginia Ducci
Fausta Avelli as Young Virginia
Gianni Garko as Francesco Ducci 
Marc Porel as Luca Fattori
Gabriele Ferzetti as Emilio Rospini
Ida Galli as Gloria Ducci 
Jenny Tamburi as Bruna
Fabrizio Jovine as Commissioner D'Elia
Riccardo Parisio Perrotti as Melli
Loredana Savelli as Giovanna Rospini
Elizabeth Turner as Virginia's Mother
Vito Passeri as Caretaker

Production 
According to director Lucio Fulci, Sette note in nero gestated over several years in development hell because producer Luigi De Laurentiis was unsure about what type of film could be made out of it. Ernesto Gastaldi stated that he had written an twelve-page outline of the film with director/producer Alberto Pugliese, titled Pentagramma in nero or Sinfonia in nero. The story dealt with a woman who dreams of a murder, and believes it will happen in real life. Film critic and historian Roberto Curti has noted that there exists a script kept at the Centro Sperimentale di Cinematografia library, titled Incubus (Pentagramma in nero), which is credited to Gastaldi, Sergio Corbucci and Mahnamen Velasco and is dated March 1972, but states that this was, in fact, an early title for La morte accarezza a mezzanotte (1972); however, Curti notes that both La morte accarezza a mezzanotte and Sette note in nero share near-identical premises of women having premonitions of murder.

Sette note in nero was written by Roberto Gianviti and Dardano Sacchetti. Fulci and Gianviti had collaborated on several films together, including Operazione San Pietro, One on Top of the Other, A Lizard in a Woman's Skin, Don't Torture a Duckling, White Fang and Challenge to White Fang. Sacchetti would later collaborate with Fulci on Zombi 2, City of the Living Dead, The Beyond and The House by the Cemetery, and The New York Ripper.

Fulci and Gianviti had been put under contract by De Laurentiis and his son Aurelio based on the success of their earlier gialli; given creative freedom to conceive a project in the same genre, they chose to adapt writer (later a film critic and distributor) Vieri Razzini's 1972 mystery novel Terapia mortale. Described by Curti as "a banal and rather poorly written whodunnit", the novel follows parapsychologist Patrick Delli as he investigates the death of his friend Mark, which he discovers to have been an act of murder through the use of psychic powers, and that Mark's wife Veronica (who Patrick is in love with) is another potential target. Barbara Bouchet was originally intended as one of the film's leads; in a July 1974 interview, she revealed that filming was intended to take place in İzmir. However, the De Laurentiises were not satisfied with Fulci and Gianviti's material, and Sacchetti was brought on board to work with the pair in summer 1975. Sacchetti noted that Fulci and Gianviti had little to show for half a year's work on the project, largely because the former misinterpreted the novel's portrayal of parapsychology as a type of magic instead of psychoanalysis. Fulci initially resented Sacchetti due to the success of his collaborations with Dario Argento and referred to him as "De Laurentiis' spy", but eventually warmed to him after Gianviti approved of his additions to the script, which served to "unblock" difficulties that Fulci and Gianviti had originally encountered, while remaining true to the spirit of the novel.

After Fulci, Gianviti and Sacchetti's initial draft was rejected by the De Laurentiises, Sacchetti suggested that they work on a new story from scratch, and asked Fulci what his biggest obsession was. When Fulci informed him that this obsession was "fate", he returned the next day with an entirely new outline that met with Fulci and Gianviti's approval. Fulci impulsively devised the title Sette note in nero after Sacchetti informed him that a carillon would serve as a key plot device in the story. Sacchetti attributes "70%" of the resulting script to Gianviti, and described his contributions as "a touch of Argento to a traditional mystery plot. The 'touch of Argento' were the suspenseful situations in general, the modalities of the deaths, especially the victim's point of view". Although an announcement that production of the film, then bearing the novel's title, would begin in November 1975 was deposited at the Ministry of Spectacle, the film was shelved again by the De Laurentiises, as their company was in financial trouble due to political and social unrest in Italy. Within several months, Fulci was able to make a deal with a smaller production company, Cinecompany, and distributor Cineriz to make the film.

Aside from sharing a theme of psychic powers and the character of Luca Fattori being a parapsychologist who harbors romantic feelings for the married Virginia, the resulting film bares little resemblance to Razzini's novel. Curti notes that Sette note in nero features several scenes and themes influenced by Fulci's earlier films, including the potentially unjust imprisonment of a man for the murder of his wife (One on Top of the Other), precognition (A Lizard in a Woman's Skin) and a character who falls to their death on a cliffside (Don't Torture a Duckling); other possible influences on the narrative include the novel Night has a Thousand Eyes by Cornell Woolrich (whose works were possible influences on One on Top of the Other and A Lizard in a Woman's Skin) and the films Don't Look Now and Death Rite.

The film was shot between September and November 1976 under the working title Dolce come morire. It was shot Incir-De Paolis Studios in Rome and at Arezzo, Siena in Italy and in Dover in England. Cameraman Franco Bruni commented on the cinematography in the film, stating that "we did a frantic use of zoom in this film" and "often used the tracking shot backwards, to reveal things. The camera was moving all the time."

Style
Sette note in nero is the fourth giallo film to have been helmed by Fulci, following One on Top of the Other, A Lizard in a Woman's Skin and Don't Torture a Duckling. Fulci's gialli have been cited as being "a far cry from his later excessive gross-out horrors", showing that the director was able to "put his finger on the free sexuality that permeated the culture at the time and the repercussions that came along with it". The film, along with the rest of Fulci's oeuvre, has been described as "progress[ing] as if the characters are trapped in some awful, illogical dream, from which there is no escape". The film's title has been noted as one of many giallo titles using either numbers or animal references, having been directly compared to Sette scialli di seta gialla.

Curti stated that the film should "more properly be considered as a 'female gothic'", with a film updated to contemporary times and blended mystery and the paranormal. In 1970s Italy, the paranormal was one of the country's most durable obsessions. This included Pier Carpi's popular books about history of magic and Cagliostro and a book of alleged prophecies of Pope John XXIII. Paranormal themes were also explored in adult comics and television miniseries such as Il segno del comando and ESP based on Dutch psychic Gerard Croiset. Filmmakers and screenwriters also delved into these themes such as Riccardo Freda, Piero Regnoli, Demofilo Fidani and Pupi Avati.

Music

Composer Fabio Frizzi also contributed to Paura nella città dei morti viventi, ...E tu vivrai nel terrore! L'aldilà, Manhattan Baby, and Fulci's 1990 film Un gatto nel cervello. The film's score was performed on a carillon, accompanied by stringed instruments, synthesisers and piano notes. The score has been described as "simple, elegant and gravely beautiful", and has been noted for "steer[ing] clear of rampant atonality and shrieking strings", unlike typical giallo film scores.

Some of the film's music was later used in the 2003 American film Kill Bill Volume 1, directed by Quentin Tarantino.} A medley of the score was later included as part of Frizzi's 2013 Fulci 2 Frizzi live tour, including the 2014 live album release Fulci 2 Frizzi: Live at Union Chapel.

Release 

Sette note in nero was released in Italy on August 10, 1977 where it was distributed by Cineriz. The film grossed a total of 594,648,345 Italian lire domestically. Curti described the film's reception in Italy as "nondescript (and therefore disappointing)", stating that it was released during a period where the giallo was waning, where a film "completely devoid of blood and gore and ultimately downbeat" was not of the interest of moviegoers.

The film was released in the United States in March 1979, where it was distributed by Group 1 International Distribution Organization under the title The Psychic. It has been released under several alternative English titles, including Murder to the Tune of the Seven Black Notes, Seven Notes in Black and Death Tolls Seven Times. It was released on DVD in English under the title The Psychic on December 18, 2007. A Blu-ray of the film was released in the United States by Scorpion Releasing in 2019; this release, created from a 2K scan of the original camera negative, includes English and Italian audio, an audio commentary with film historian Troy Howarth and an interview with Sacchetti. In the United Kingdom, a bilingual Blu-ray distributed by Shameless Screen Entertainment was released on August 9, 2021, featuring a revised subtitle translation for the Italian track, interviews with Fulci's daughter Antonella, Sacchetti and Frizzi, and a demonstration of the film's 2K restoration process.

Reception
DVD Talk's Stuart Galbraith gave Sette note in nero three-and-a-half stars out of five, calling it "a very effective little thriller, smartly directed and engrossing". Galbraith felt that the film "offers few surprises" but moves with "palpable suspense", and added that the final scenes are "genuinely harrowing". Writing for Allrovi, Sandra Brennan rated the film one star out of five. A review in The Washington Post by Gary Arnold described the film as "an uneven experiment in terror". Arnold was critical of the post-dubbed nature of the sound, and of Fulci's "excesses of enthusiasm" in direction, but felt that this was more enjoyable than the "laborious tease" of the contemporary film Halloween.

Bloody Disgusting's Chris Eggertsen included the film as number seven in a countdown of the "Top Ten Underrated Horror Gems", citing its "excellent cinematography [and] deft use of color", though criticising its "poor use of dubbing". Sette note in nero has been compared to the American film Eyes of Laura Mars, released the following year. Italian film critic Riccardo Strada has described Sette note in nero as "effectively sinister and disturbing", finding it full of "healthy unease".

Proposed remake
Sometime in the 1990s, filmmaker Quentin Tarantino considered remaking Sette note in nero, with Jackie Brown star Bridget Fonda in the role of Virginia. By the year 2000, Tarantino gave an update on the proposed remake: "It's a project in the murky future. I don't even own the rights to that stuff. It's one of those things where it's like if somebody buys the rights to make it, I won't make it. They can totally fuck it up. If it's meant to happen, it'll happen". No further remarks on the project were made until Sacchetti revealed in an interview conducted for the film's 2019 Blu-ray that he had been in contact with producers from Sony Pictures, who were interested in having Tarantino or other directors remake the film. The 1984 Tamil movie Nooraavathu Naal, is loosely based on Sette note in nero. Another remake, a Hindi-language 'Bollywood' film titled 100 Days, was released in 1991.

Notes

Footnotes

References

External links
 
 

1977 films
1970s Italian-language films
Giallo films
1970s thriller films
Italian thriller films
Films directed by Lucio Fulci
Films scored by Fabio Frizzi
1970s Italian films